Leptosia marginea, the black-edged spirit, is a butterfly in the family Pieridae. It is found in Sierra Leone, Liberia, Ivory Coast, Ghana, Togo, Benin, southern Nigeria, Cameroon, Gabon, the Republic of the Congo, the Central African Republic, the western part of the Democratic Republic of the Congo and possibly Uganda and Tanzania. The habitat consists of primary forests.

The larvae feed on Capparis species.

References

External links
Seitz, A. Die Gross-Schmetterlinge der Erde 13: Die Afrikanischen Tagfalter. Plate XIII 10

Butterflies described in 1890
marginea
Taxa named by Paul Mabille
Butterflies of Africa